Callostrotia is a monotypic moth genus of the family Noctuidae. Its only species, Callostrotia flavizonata, is found in Nigeria. Both the genus and species were first described by George Hampson in 1914.

References

Acontiinae
Monotypic moth genera